Abdul Malik Mujahid (born 1951) is an American imam, producer, author, and non-profit executive. Mujahid has been selected eight times as one of the "World's 500 Most Influential Muslims".

Accomplishments 
He is the founding president of Sound Vision which was established in 1988 in Chicago. It is a non-profit organization which develops Islam-related content for the international news media to develop inter-faith peace and understanding. He is also the executive producer of Chicago's radio talk-show program Radio Islam. Abdul Malik Mujahid, a local Chicago Muslim leader and founder of Soundvision and Radio Islam, was recognized here at an annual event in 2016 for his achievements by the Chicago Muslim community organization, The Council of Islamic Organizations of Greater Chicago.

International interfaith movement
Mujahid has been active with the interfaith movement since the 1993 Parliament of the World's Religions was revived. He has addressed the Parliament in Cape Town, South Africa, Barcelona, Spain and Melbourne, Australia. In November 2009, the Board of Trustees of the council for a Parliament of the World's Religions elected him as chairman. Abdul Malik Mujahid chaired the international 2015 Parliament in Salt Lake City which was attended by 11,000 people from 50 religions and 80 countries.

He has served on the Independent Task Force on Civil Liberties and National Security by the Council on Foreign Relations in New York from 2006 to 2009. He also served on the independent task force of The Chicago Council on Global Affairs on the civic and political integration of Muslim Americans. This task force's report, Strengthening America: The Civic and Political Integration of Muslim Americans, was issued on June 26, 2007, calling for Muslims and non-Muslims to work together to create full and equal opportunities for Muslim Americans to participate in American civic and political life.

In 2008, he served on the Credentials Committee of the Democratic National Convention.

Mujahid is a founding member of a PAC (Political Action Committee) called - Muslim Democrats.

Mujahid is among the faith leaders asking for better policies on climate change. On September 21, 2014, along with Al Gore, he addressed a major interfaith gathering at Cathedral Church of St. John the Divine in New York City, saying that climate change will be one of the major themes of the forthcoming Parliament of the World's Religions.

He has been a major supporter of the undocumented workers' movement, speaking and leading one of the largest marches in Chicago history for immigration rights. Mujahid has served at the steering committee of the Midwest Coalition for Human Rights. As the national coordinator of the Bosnia Task Force USA, in the 1990s. He successfully led efforts in collaboration with the National Organization for Women (NOW) to declare rape as a war crime in the international law for the first time in human history.

Mujahid also chairs a coalition, Burma Task Force, USA, that reaches out to media and community stakeholders, US policymakers and international NGOs and human rights groups to raise awareness of ongoing genocide and persecution. Burma Task Force includes involvement of 17 other organizations from the Muslim American community. Based on Burma Task Force lawsuit a federal court summons Burmese President Thein Sein and several Burmese ministers for human rights violations allegedly committed against the stateless Rohingya Muslim minority. The US embassy in Yangon, however, issued a clarification that the lawsuit has nothing to do with Washington's policy toward Burma. He co-chaired an international conference, in early 2015, at the Nobel Peace Center, Oslo, Norway, where 7 Nobel Peace Laureates declared that what Rohingya are facing in Burma is a "text book case of genocide". The Nobel Laureates included Desmond Tutu from South Africa, Mairead Maguire from Ireland, Jody Williams from the US, Tawakkol Karman from Yemen, Shirin Ebadi from Iran, Leymah Gbowee from Liberia and Adolfo Pérez Esquivel from Argentina. Burma Task Force is housed at Justice for All, a not for profit organization and the member of the Task Force.

Mujahid's leadership Sound Vision also initiated and coordinated an informal network of 26 Muslim organizations against domestic violence.

Mujahid developed a friendship with Muhammad Ali after meeting him at a reception given by the Mayor of Chicago in 1977 in honor of Imam Warith Deen Mohammed.  Ali worked with Mujahid to lend a famous name to the efforts of the Bosnia Task Force, and also marched with Mujahid in Chicago in the 1980s in support of oppressed Palestinians.  Mujahid volunteered with Ali for food distribution.

As an imam, he gives Friday sermons ("khutba" in Arabic) at various Chicago mosques and prayer locations.

From 2005 to 2008, he served as Chairman of the Council of the Islamic Organizations of Greater Chicago (CIOGC).

In 2020, he filed for 2nd Democratic Delegate in the Illinois Democratic Primary. He lost the race to Robin Kelly. 

He has authored one book, Conversion to Islam: Untouchables Strategy for Protest in India, which won the Outstanding Academic Book of the Year Award in 1990 from the American Library Association.

Campaign Against Terror, War and Hate 
Imam Mujahid has consistently challenged the extremists' perspectives through critiques rooted in Islamic sources. Condemning terrorist attacks on the French magazine Charlie Hebdo, he wrote, "one cannot avenge the prophet who banned revenges." Speaking on Fox News', the O'Reilly Factor, he again condemned the terrorists but also questioned why Muslims who had saved the lives of Jewish Parisians and a Muslim policeman who was slain in the Paris attack were not being celebrated by the media.

Imam Malik Mujahid on a regular basis provides thinking and talking points to Imams and community leaders on various issues including on how to deal with issues related to news of terror attack and sample press release/statements of condemnation. While condemning terrorism, Imam Mujahid also asserted that American Muslims are more peaceful than other Americans communities. However, he wants the Muslim community to do more than just condemn terrorism. In frustration,  he coined a phrase "condemning terrorism has become the 6th pillar of Islam." Lamenting on the gap between Muslim condemnation and a common perception of those who feel Muslims don't condemn terrorism, Imam Mujahid launched several initiatives including an anti-ISIS campaign.

Developing Resources to Deter Muslim Youth from Extremism 
Under Imam Mujahid's guidance Sound Vision has produced multiple resources to strengthen Muslim communities' outreach and engagement of Muslim youth. Some of these resources are directly aimed at preventing extremism. and educating youth and parents about how to deal with issues related to discussing extremism and terrorism.

Hey ISIS You Suck!!! Campaign 
In the aftermath of 2016 Orlando terror attack, Imam Mujahid led a campaign in Chicago in August 2016 condemning the terror organization ISIS. The campaign consisted of a billboard on a prominent highway with a short message, '"Hey ISIS, you Suck!!!" signed by #ActualMuslims. Imam Mujahid told CBS Evening News that as Christians defeated KKK, it is important for Muslims to do their part in defeating ISIS. Later Sound Vision, led by Mujahid, invited others communities to take this billboard campaign to their cities.  As a result, this billboard has appeared in St. Louis, Missouri Miami, Florida  and Phoenix, Arizona. The billboard campaign was also accompanied by a social media campaign with the hashtag, "#ActualMuslims." The campaign received wide media coverage. However, some questioned if the real target of the billboard was ISIS or those who think Muslims don't condemn terrorism. Funds are being raised to take this campaign to Times Square.

While the ISIS Sucks campaign was billboard based it was also accompanied by supporting booklets written by Mujahid and produced by Sound Vision. One booklet contrasted Prophet Muhammad's teachings with the abhorrent behavior of ISIS; another compared ISIS to the Egyptian president Sisi and argued that both are oppressive undemocratic regimes disregarding human life. Another anti-ISIS brochure debunks the ISIS argument about the revival of slavery.

Anti-war and anti-nuke positions 
Imam Mujahid says he is against terrorism but cannot support the War on Terror.  For the same reason he speaks out against war as well. Mujahid joined the National Council of Churches in asking President Bush to commit to "draw back from the use and threat of 'first strike' war."

Imam Malik Mujahid has spoken against using nuclear weapons at the United Nations. He was a guest speaker at the 25th anniversary of the elimination of the nuclear weapons in Kazakhstan. Mujahid was also a signatory of a joint statement by religious leaders, parliamentarians and mayors on the 70th anniversary of the Hiroshima and Nagasaki bombing s  calling for a nuclear free world. He was one of the leading organizers of a major anti-war march in New York where 100 Imams endorsed a statement against war and terror. The rally was organized by the United National Antiwar Coalition (UNAC) with support from Muslim Peace Coalition. He has joined 1,000 other world leaders in criticizing the war on drugs as well.

War, Terror, and Hate as a connected cycle 
Imam Mujahid considers war-terror-hate to be a connected cycle that dehumanizes and kills human beings. While reflecting on Laden's death he made mention of this war-terror-hate as a cycle again. "While condemning terrorism seems to have become almost a sixth pillar of Islam, it is important that Muslim American organizations achieve a higher level of credibility by pointing out that occupation, torture, disregard to the due process, and denial of the electoral process breeds terrorism."

Imam Mujahid organized a special track at the Parliament of the World's Religions against the war-terror-hate cycle. It resulted in a declaration against hate speech, war and violence as well as some follow up resources. Since Mujahid considers war-terror-hate a connected destructive cycle, he has organized training sessions for Muslim Peace Coalition to combat Islamophobia in Berkeley, CA and Long Island, NY.  Mujahid assisted Charter For Compassion to develop their Anti-Islamophobia Guide.  He has also offered webinars and seminars against the rising hate. Mujahid has emerged as an expert on Islamophobia. He has provided resources to students, mosques, and interfaith organizations on fighting Islamophobia.  He has written about the impact of Islamophobia on Muslim children,  and challenges of anger among Muslim youth.  He has compiled statistics on Islamophobia in USA for years 2008  & 2011.

Fight against the Muslim Ban 
While fighting Islamophobia he has also fought against what he considers to be anti-Muslim legislation. He criticized President Obama's signing into law the indefinite detention of the US citizens.  Mujahid is an Amicus in Hawaii versus Trump  and in the US Court of Appeal 4th District.  He has extensively written against the Muslim Ban as well.

Writings

Abdul Malik Mujahid is a frequent contributor of analytical opinion pieces on world events.  Here is a selected list of his writings:

The Unwinnable Wars on Drug and Terror
Muslims Are More Peaceful Than Their Neighbors
Sharia and the Lives of Muslim Americans
Katrina: Where Faith and Interfaith Groups Picked Up as Federal Government Failed
Words of Burma's Religious Affairs Minister Too Serious to Ignore
Why Do Afghans Have a Life Expectancy of Only 44 Years?

Media appearances
Appearance on Bill O'Reilly Show Defending Program by Muslims about the Prophet Muhammad

References

External links
 Sound Vision Website 
 Radio Islam website
 Burma Task Force USA website

1951 births
20th-century American politicians
21st-century American politicians
American imams
American Muslims
American politicians of Pakistani descent
Film producers from Illinois
Illinois Democrats
Living people
Muslim activists
Muslim writers
Pakistani emigrants to the United States
Politicians from Chicago
Religious leaders in North America
University of Chicago alumni
Writers from Chicago